Cnemaspis jacobsoni is a species of gecko, a lizard in the family Gekkonidae. The species is endemic to Indonesia.

Etymology
The specific name, jacobsoni, is in honor of Dutch naturalist Edward Richard Jacobson (1870–1944).

Reproduction
C. jacobsoni is oviparous.

References

Further reading
Das I (2005). "Revision of the Genus Cnemaspis Strauch, 1887 (Sauria: Gekkonidae), from the Mentawai and Adjacent Archipelagos off Western Sumatra, Indonesia, with the Description of Four New Species". Journal of Herpetology 39 (2): 233–247. (Cnemaspis jacobsoni, new species).

jacobsoni
Reptiles described in 2005